Loreintz Rosier (born 14 August 1998) is a French professional footballer who plays for G.D. Estoril Praia as a midfielder.

Career

Club career
Rosier started playing football at the age of 6 at Saint-Brice FC. He then moved to Le Bourget FC and later AAS Sarcelles to play at the highest youth level. Beside that, he also trained at INF Clairefontaine. In 2013, he signed a three-year youth contract with SM Caen, but decided to leave the club after two season following disputes. He then returned to his first club, Saint-Brice FC, where he played for the senior team in his first year U19 player. He then spent a season with Paris FC’s reserve team in the Championnat National 3 and also played for the club's U19s.

After a season with FC Sochaux' reserve team, Rosier moved to Portuguese club Vitória S.C. in the summer 2018, starting on the club's B-team. On 23 September 2018, Rosier made his professional debut with Vitória Guimarães B in a 2018–19 LigaPro match against Leixões.

In the summer 2020, Rosier moved to G.D. Estoril Praia.

References

External links

1998 births
Living people
French footballers
French expatriate footballers
Association football midfielders
Championnat National 3 players
Liga Portugal 2 players
Stade Malherbe Caen players
FC Sochaux-Montbéliard players
Paris FC players
Vitória S.C. B players
G.D. Estoril Praia players
French expatriate sportspeople in Portugal
Expatriate footballers in Portugal